Khanimeh-ye Pain (also Romanized as Khanīmeh-ye Pā’īn; also known as Khanīmeh-ye Soflá) is a village in Rostam-e Seh Rural District, Sorna District, Rostam County, Fars Province, Iran. At the 2006 census, its population was 205, in 33 families.

References 

Populated places in Rostam County